The Belly of the Sea is a 2021 Spanish drama film directed and written by Agustí Villaronga, based on the novel Ocean Sea by Italian writer Alessandro Baricco. It was shot in black and white and stars Roger Casamajor and Òscar Kapoya.

Plot
In June, 1816, the French frigate Alliance runs aground off the coast of Senegal. Without enough boats for everyone, a raft is built to tow 147 men to shore. But panic and confusion seize the convoy and cut the tow rope, abandoning the raft to its fate. Hunger, madness and a fierce fight break out on that drifting raft. Savigny, a ruthless medical officer, and Thomas, a rebellious private sailor, face each other with a different attitude to survive. A horror that lasted for days and days. A scene where the greatest of cruelties and the sweetest of pieties were shown.

Cast
 Roger Casamajor as Savigny
 Òscar Kapoya as Thomas
 Muminu Diayo as Thèrese
 Marc Bonnín as Markus

Production 
The Belly of the Sea was produced by Testamento and La Perifèrica Produccions alongside Turkana Films, Link-up Barcelona and Bastera Films, with the participation of IB3 and TV3, funding from the ICAA, support from the ICEC, and the sponsoring of Fundació Mallorca Turisme and the Mallorca Film Commission. It was fully shot in the island of Mallorca.

Release
The film made its world premiere at the 43rd Moscow International Film Festival (MIFF) in April 2021 as part of the official competition. In June 2021, it also screened at the Málaga Spanish Film Festival (FMCE), where it won six awards including the Golden Biznaga for Best Spanish Film. It was likewise presented at the 69th San Sebastián International Film Festival, screened as part of the 'Made in Spain' section. Distributed by Elástica Films and Filmin, it was released in Spain on 12 November 2021.

Critical reception
On review aggregator website Rotten Tomatoes, the film holds an approval rating of 60% based on 5 reviews, with an average rating of 5.80. Javier Ocaña from El País commented "it's not an easy film, although it is a relevant study on cowardice and ineptitude, abandonment and forgetfulness, which unfortunately extends through the ages". Writing for Fotogramas, Beatriz Martínez rated the film four out of five stars, marvelling how, with a very low budget, Villaronga managed to create a masterpiece.

Awards and nominations

|-
| rowspan="7" align = "center" | 2021 || 43rd Moscow International Film Festival || Critics's Jury Award || The Belly of the Sea ||  || 
|-
| rowspan="6"| 24th Málaga Film Festival
| Golden Biznaga for Best Spanish Film
| The Belly of the Sea
| 
| rowspan="6" | 
|-
| Silver Biznaga for Best Director
| rowspan="2"|Agustí Villaronga
| 
|-
| Silver Biznaga for Best Screenplay
| 
|-
| Silver Biznaga for Best Actor
| Roger Casamajor
| 
|-
| Silver Biznaga for Best Score
| Marcús J.G.R.
| 
|-
| Silver Biznaga for Best Cinematography
| Josep María Civit and Blai Tòmas
| 
|-
| align = "center" rowspan = "16" | 2022 || 9th Feroz Awards || colspan = "2" | Arrebato Award (fiction film) ||  || 
|-
| 77th CEC Medals || Best Adapted Screenplay || Agustí Villaronga ||  || 
|-
| 36th Goya Awards || Best Adapted Screenplay || Agustí Villaronga ||  || 
|-
| rowspan = "13" | 14th Gaudí Awards || colspan = "2" | Best Film ||  || rowspan = "12" | 
|-
| Best Director || Agustí Villaronga || 
|-
| Best Screenplay || Agustí Villaronga || 
|-
| Best Actor || Roger Casamajor || 
|-
| Best Production Supervision || Bàrbara Ferrer || 
|-
| Best Art Direction || Susy Gómez || 
|-
| Best Editing || Bernat Aragonés || 
|-
| Best Original Music || Marcús JGR || 
|-
| Best Cinematography || Josep M. Civit, Blai Tomàs || 
|-
| Best Costume Design || Susy Gómez, Pau Aulí || 
|-
| Best Visual Effects || Anna Aragonès || 
|-
| Best Makeup and Hairstyles || Alma Casal || 
|-
| colspan = "2" | Public's Choice Special Award for Best Film ||  || 
|}

See also 
 List of Spanish films of 2021

References

External links
 

Spanish drama films
Films shot in Mallorca
Films based on Italian novels
2021 drama films
2020s Catalan-language films
2020s Spanish films
Films directed by Agustí Villaronga